The Austria national under-19 football team is the national under-19 football team of Austria and is controlled by the Austrian Football Association.

The team competes in the UEFA European Under-19 Football Championship which is held every year.

Competition records

FIFA U-20 World Cup

*Draws include knockout matches decided on penalty kicks.

UEFA European Under-19 Football Championship 

*Draws include knockout matches decided on penalty kicks.

Results and fixtures
 The following is a list of match results in the last 12 months, as well as any future matches that have been scheduled.

Legend

2021

2022

Current squad 
 The following players were called up for the 2022 UEFA European Under-19 Championship.
 Match dates: 18 June – 1 July 2022
 Caps and goals correct as of: 26 March 2022, after the match against 
 Names in italics denote players who have been capped for the senior team.

 2022 UEFA European Under-19 Championship 

 Qualified teams for the final tournament 

The following teams qualified for the final tournament of the 2022 UEFA European Under-19 Championship'.Note: All appearance statistics include only U-19 era (since 2002).''

References

External links
Austria U-19 on UEFA.com
Austria U-19 on OEFB.at

F
European national under-19 association football teams